Daniel Perreault (born 11 April 1961) is a Canadian fencer. He competed in the individual and team épée events at the 1984 Summer Olympics.

References

External links
 

1961 births
Living people
Canadian male fencers
Olympic fencers of Canada
Fencers at the 1984 Summer Olympics
Sportspeople from Quebec
People from Dolbeau-Mistassini
Pan American Games medalists in fencing
Pan American Games gold medalists for Canada
Fencers at the 1983 Pan American Games